The 2019 Big Ten Conference men's soccer season was the 29th season of men's varsity soccer in the conference. The regular season began on August 30, 2019, and concluded on November 3, 2019. The season culminated with the 2019 Big Ten Conference Men's Soccer Tournament to determine the conference's automatic berth into the 2019 NCAA Division I Men's Soccer Tournament. The tournament began on November 10, 2019 and concluded on November 17, 2019.

Indiana finished the season as the Big Ten Champions. Maryland enters the season as the defending NCAA Tournament champions. Indiana went on to win the Big Ten regular season and tournament.

Background

Previous season 

The previous season was the 28th season of men's varsity soccer in the conference. The 2018 Big Ten regular season began on August 24, 2018 concluded on October 28, 2018. The season culminated with the 2018 Big Ten Conference Men's Soccer Tournament to determine the conference's automatic berth into the 2018 NCAA Division I Men's Soccer Tournament.  Indiana went on to win both the regular season and the tournament, winning all eight of their Big Ten Conference games. They defeated Michigan in the Big Ten Men's Soccer Championship Game.

With the Big Ten title, Indiana earned the conference's automatic berth into the 2018 NCAA Tournament, where Maryland, Michigan, and Michigan State joined as at-large berths. The conference had the strongest showing in the NCAA Tournament, where three of their four berths reached the College Cup (Final Four) of the tournament. Big Ten side, Maryland, would defeat Akron in the National Championship Game to win their fourth NCAA title, and their first since 2008.

Concluding the tournament, Indiana senior and captain, Andrew Gutman, won the TopDrawerSoccer.com National Player of the Year Award as well as the Missouri Athletic Club's Hermann Trophy. Gutman would forgo an opportunity to sign a homegrown contract with the Chicago Fire and signed with Celtic in Scotland. Indiana sophomore forward, Griffin Dorsey was the highest Big Ten player selected in the 2019 MLS SuperDraft, being drafted by Toronto FC ninth overall. Eleven other Big Ten players were selected in the MLS SuperDraft, the most of any collegiate conference, and an additional four signed homegrown player contracts with their parent MLS clubs.

Coaching changes 
Dan Donigan, the former head coach of Rutgers was fired following the 2018 season and was replaced by Fordham head coach, Jim McElderry.

Head coaches

Preseason

Preseason poll 
The preseason poll was released on August 26, 2019.

Preseason national polls 
The preseason national polls will be released in July and August 2019.

Regular season

Early season tournaments 

Early season tournaments will be announced in late Spring and Summer 2019.

Postseason

Big Ten Tournament 

The Big Ten Tournament was played from November 9–17. Indiana won the tournament, defeating Michigan in the final.

NCAA Tournament 

The NCAA Tournament will begin in November 2019 and conclude on December 17, 2019.

Rankings

National rankings

Regional rankings - USC North Region 

The USC North Region compares teams across the Big Ten Conference, Horizon League, and Mid-American Conference.

Statistics

Goals

Assists

Shutouts

Awards and honors

Player of the week honors

Postseason honors 

* denotes unanimous selection

All-Americans

To earn "consensus" status, a player must win honors based on a point system computed from the four different all-America teams. The point system consists of three points for first team, two points for second team and one point for third team. No honorable mention or fourth team or lower are used in the computation. The top five totals plus ties are first team and the next five plus ties are second team.

Other awards 
 TopDrawerSoccer.com National Freshman of the Year Award: Aidan Morris, Indiana

2020 MLS Draft

The 2020 MLS SuperDraft was held in January 2020. Nine Big Ten players were selected in the draft, all in the first three rounds.

Homegrown players 

The Homegrown Player Rule is a Major League Soccer program that allows MLS teams to sign local players from their own development academies directly to MLS first team rosters. Before the creation of the rule in 2008, every player entering Major League Soccer had to be assigned through one of the existing MLS player allocation processes, such as the MLS SuperDraft.

To place a player on its homegrown player list, making him eligible to sign as a homegrown player, players must have resided in that club's home territory and participated in the club's youth development system for at least one year. Players can play college soccer and still be eligible to sign a homegrown contract.

References

External links 
 Big Ten Men's Soccer

 
2019 NCAA Division I men's soccer season
2019